The Conservation Volunteers' Green Gym programme aims to provide people with a way to enhance their fitness and health while taking action to improve the outdoor environment. It can be seen as enabling people to get fit who would not normally attend a conventional gym or sports centre.

Organization
As of 2006 the majority of Green Gym groups are run directly by The Conservation Volunteers, the community volunteering charity. The rest are either self-supporting or run under licence by other organisations. A Green Gym Licence Agreement provides the framework for an organisation to run a Green Gym project. The Conservation Volunteers provides a high level of support to help start up and run a Green Gym project to The Conservation Volunteers standards. Under the Licence Agreement, organisations have the right to use the Green Gym name, and receive guidance and, if necessary, training on how to run a Green Gym group. The Licence Agreement may be renewed annually by mutual agreement.

Origins and development
The Green Gym concept was originally developed in the late 1990s by Dr William Bird an Oxford-based general practitioner and The Conservation Volunteers (then BTCV). The first pilot was held in 1997. By 2006 there were 55 projects across the United Kingdom with an estimated 6,000 people taking part. The programme has received support from central government, and won a Charity Award in 2005.

Green Gym sessions

What happens
Green Gym groups meet at least once a week and do between 1 and 4 hours practical conservation or gardening work. All participants are Volunteers.  Over two-thirds have never taken part in environmental conservation work before.  Examples of the types of work undertaken include coppicing, clearing scrubland, path building, tree planting or digging on an allotment.

The group usually meets at the project site. Sessions include a refreshment break and a chance to socialise. Activities are led by a qualified leader, and a session will typically run as follows:

 'Tool Talk' - the safe handling and correct use of tools are discussed
 Warm up - exercises to prepare muscles for activity and reduce the risk of injury
 Work session
 Refreshments
 Work session
 Gather up tools
 Cool down - exercises to prevent stiffness

Health benefits
Both physical and psychological benefits are claimed for people who attend Green Gym sessions regularly.

In 1999 and 2001, The School of Health and Social Care at Oxford Brookes University independently evaluated the Green Gym projects in Oxfordshire and East Sussex, England and identified the following benefits from Green Gym tasks:

 significant improvements in cardiovascular fitness, provided that they are performed regularly.
 improved muscular strength (as measured by handgrip strength) leading to increased coping ability and reduced risk of functional limitations in later life.
 almost a third more calories can be burnt in an hour of some Green Gym activities than in doing a step aerobics class.
 a significant improvement in the Mental Health Component Score in the first 3 months of participation (as measured by the SF-12 health-related quality of life instrument).
 a strong trend in the decrease in depression scores during the same time period.
 waist-to-hip ratio decrease in the first three months.
 The Green Gym is viewed by participants as being beneficial to their mental health and wellbeing.

See also
 Green exercise

References

External links
The Conservation Volunteers Green Gym web pages
Oxford Brookes University, School of Health and Social Care research publications

Environmental charities based in the United Kingdom
Conservation in the United Kingdom
Green exercise
Outdoor education organizations